William Theodotus Capers (August 9, 1867 - March 29, 1943) was bishop of the Diocese of West Texas in the Episcopal Church in the United States from 1916 until his death.

Early life and education
Capers was born on August 9, 1867 in Greenville, South Carolina, the son of Confederate General, and later Bishop of South Carolina, Ellison Capers and his wife Charlotte Rebecca Palmer. He studied at South Carolina College between 1885 and 1886, and later at Furman University from 1886 until his graduation 1887. He also trained for the priesthood at the Virginia Theological Seminary and graduated in 1894. He also earned his Master of Arts from the Kentucky State University in 1911. He was awarded an honorary Doctor of Divinity from the University of the South and another from the Virginia Theological Seminary, both in 1914.

Ordained Ministry
Capers was ordained deacon on June 29, 1894 in the chapel of the Virginia Seminary, and advanced to the priesthood on May 12, 1895
on both occasions by his father Bishop Ellison Capers. He served as rector of Grace Church in Anderson, South Carolina between 1895 and 1901; Holy Trinity Church in Vicksburg, Mississippi between 1901 and 1903; Trinity Church in Asheville, North Carolina from 1903 until 1905; Dean of Christ Church Cathedral in Lexington, Kentucky between 1905 and 1912; and then rector of the Church of the Holy Apostles in Philadelphia from 1912 until 1913.

Episcopacy
On November 19, 1913, Capers was elected on the first ballot as Coadjutor Bishop of West Texas during a special session of the council held in St Mark's Church, San Antonio. He was then consecrated on May 1, 1914 at St Mark's by  Presiding Bishop Daniel S. Tuttle. He succeeded as diocesan in 1916 and remained in office until his death on March 29, 1943. He had been hospitalized for a week at Santa Rosa Hospital in San Antonio where he died.

References 

1867 births
1943 deaths
Episcopal bishops of West Texas
Furman University alumni
Kentucky State University alumni
Virginia Theological Seminary alumni